The Rantembe Dam is a  hydroelectric gravity dam at Rantembe, in the Central Province of Sri Lanka. Construction of the dam began in January 1987, and was completed in April 1990 as scheduled. The dam was constructed by the German 'Joint Venture Randenigala'; a different German joint venture has built the Randenigala Dam, further upstream.

Dam, reservoir, and power station 

Water from the reservoir is channelled through the dam through a steel penstock to power the two  turbines. The power station's combined output of 52-megawatts generates  annually.

See also 

 List of dams and reservoirs in Sri Lanka
 List of power stations in Sri Lanka

References

External links 
 

Buildings and structures in Kandy District
Dams in Sri Lanka
Gravity dams
Hydroelectric power stations in Sri Lanka
Dams completed in 1990